Sarmatosuchus is an extinct genus of archosauriform reptile found in sediments of  Middle Triassic age and known from the single species Sarmatosuchus otschevi. It is one of the earliest stem-archosaur species known. The holotype and only specimen was found in lithified river deposits of the Donguz Formation exposed near the Berdyanka River, Orenburg region, Russia. The genus was originally included in the extinct family Proterosuchidae. However, later analysis by David Gower and Andrei Sennikov, the describing author, has removed it from the Proterosuchidae and designated it a basal archosauriform.

References

Prehistoric archosauriforms
Prehistoric reptile genera
Anisian genera
Middle Triassic reptiles of Europe
Triassic Russia
Fossils of Russia
Fossil taxa described in 1994